Michael Emile "Mikey" Craig (born 15 February 1960) is a British musician and DJ of Jamaican descent, best known as the bassist of the pop/soul/new wave group Culture Club.

Craig's group Culture Club became one of the most successful bands of the 1980s, selling millions of albums. In 1988, he released a solo single entitled "I'm a Believer", which failed to make an impact.

Craig was an executive producer, in the mid-1990s, for his own dance label, SLAMM records.

Craig continues to tour with Culture Club and its original members Boy George, Roy Hay, and Jon Moss. Craig has also occasionally performed with Kid Creole and the Coconuts during their UK shows.

Personal life
Craig went to St Clement Danes School in DuCane Road, Hammersmith. Craig had two children with Cleo Scott (daughter of the author and political campaigner Erin Pizzey), a son, Keita, born in 1977 and a daughter Amber, born 18 months later. Keita was a paranoid schizophrenic who committed suicide in Wandsworth Prison in 2000. Craig ended his relationship with Cleo Scott shortly after Culture Club's rise to fame in 1982. He is now married to an Italian woman named Lilli and they have three sons: Milo Emile, the footballer Paco Gigi, and Geo Luca.

References

1960 births
Living people
English bass guitarists
English male guitarists
Male bass guitarists
English people of Jamaican descent
Black British DJs
Culture Club members
Grammy Award winners
People from Hammersmith
People educated at St. Clement Danes School